The Dallas–Fort Worth Film Critics Association Award for Best Screenplay is an award presented by the Dallas–Fort Worth Film Critics Association. It is given in honor of a screenwriter who has delivered an outstanding screenplay while working in the film industry.

Winners

1990s

2000s

2010s

2020s

References

External links
 Official website

Screenplay
Screenwriting awards for film